Ramsagar, located in the village Tajpur in Dinajpur District. It is the most-frequently visited tourist destination in Dinajpur.

Location
It is situated about 8 kilometers south of the Dinajpur town.

Description
The lake is about 1,079 meters long from north to south, and 192.6 meters wide from east to west. It was created in the mid-1750s, funded by Raja Ram Nath, after whom the lake is named. The excavation cost 30,000 taka at that time, and about 1.5 million labourers took part in the project.

References

Wetlands of Bangladesh